The diademed tanager (Stephanophorus diadematus) is a species of Neotropical bird in the tanager family Thraupidae. It is the only member of the genus Stephanophorus. It is purple-blue with a white crown characterised by a small red patch, and it is found mostly in open areas in southern Brazil, northeast Argentina, and Uruguay.

Taxonomy
The diademed tanager was formally described and illustrated in 1823 by the Dutch zoologist Coenraad Jacob Temminck under the binomial name Tanagra diademata. The type locality is Curitiba in Brazil. This is now the only species placed in the genus Stephanophorus that was introduced in 1841 by the English naturalist Hugh Edwin Strickland. The genus name combines the Ancient Greek stephanē meaning "diadem" and -phoros meaning "carrying". The specific epithet diadematus is Latin meaning "diademed". The diademed tanager is monotypic: no subspecies are recognised.

References

External links
 Xenon-canto: audio recordings of the diademed tanager

diademed tanager
diademed tanager
Birds of the Atlantic Forest
Birds of Argentina
Birds of the Selva Misionera
Birds of the South Region
Birds of Uruguay
diademed tanager